Cesar Oscar Paiber (born February 13, 1970) is an Argentine former professional footballer who played for Tigre, Gimnasia y Tiro, Hamrun Spartans, Godoy Cruz, Independiente, Hibernians and Marsaxlokk, during his career he played often as a defender and sometimes as a midfielder.

Personal life
Paiber's son, Brandon Paiber is also a professional footballer, and represents the Malta national football team.

References

External links
 Cesar Paiber at MaltaFootball.com

Living people
1970 births
Argentine footballers
Club Atlético Independiente footballers
Ħamrun Spartans F.C. players
Hibernians F.C. players
Marsaxlokk F.C. players
Għajnsielem F.C. players
Expatriate footballers in Malta
Argentine expatriate footballers
Association football defenders
Association football midfielders